Dikshit (ISO: , ; also spelled as Dixit or Dikshitar) is traditionally a Hindu family name.

Origin
The word is an adjectival form of the Sanskrit word diksha, meaning provider of knowledge. Dikshita in Sanskrit derives itself as a person involved in scientific studies, and literally translates as "one who has received initiation or one who is initiated". It may also be used to mean one who prepares boys for the performance of religious duties. Historically, the surname has been usually associated with professions related to knowledge, generally used among teachers and scholars. The word dixit means the one who has been initiated.
The Dikshit/Dixit surname is usually associated with Hindu Brahmins in India especially in Northern India, Maharashtra and Nepal.

In the ancient days, Brahmins were associated with the rituals and Vedic Yajnas, and performed the same. Since these rituals were much complicated affairs, and needed a vast study of religious texts, they had to spend seven years or more on this vocation to specialise. Thus derived their family names. Dixit Brahmins often reside in Uttar Pradesh, Uttrakhand, Punjab, Haryana,  Madhya Pradesh, Jharkhand, Bihar, and Maharashtra.

There were some who were initiated to perform long Yajnas, one-year, two-year or even many-year-long Yajnas; they were initiated into the same, and had to undergo the rules for the entire period. Hence, to differentiate them from others, they were called as dixit, or the initiated, so that they do not indulge in other worldly affairs, and devote their time to the Yajnas they were committed to.

It is the same with the Vajpayee Brahmins, who excelled in performing Vajpeya, a shraut Yajna. There are some Brahmins with the surname of “Soma Yaaji” or those, who performed the Soma Yajna. There is one such title of “Yajwaa”, the one who performs the Yajna.

The most common such title is the “Agnihotri “, one who performs the daily rituals of offering to Fire God. There are Brahmins with the title “Hotaa”, who belonged to the tradition of Rigveda, in the Yajnas. Then there are Satpathy, who relied on the Shatpatha Brahamana. The word is an adjective form of the Sanskrit word diksha, meaning provider of knowledge. Dikshit in Sanskrit derives itself as a person involved in scientific studies, and literally translates as "one who has received initiation or one who is initiated".

In the southern state of Tamil Nadu, the famous Nataraja temple of Chidambaram is managed and administered hereditarily by a class of Vaidika Brahmins called Chidambaram Dikshitar whom, legends say, were brought here, from Mount Kailash, by Maharshi Patanjali, specifically for the performance of the daily rituals and maintenance of the great temple of Chidambaram.

Notable individuals

Dixit
 Avinash Dixit, Indian-American economist originally of Indian nationality
 Jyotindra Nath Dixit, former National Security Advisor of India who belongs to Nair community
 Kamal Mani Dixit, Nepali writer
 Kanak Mani Dixit, Nepali publisher, editor and writer
 Madan Mani Dixit, Nepali writer
 Madhuri Dixit, Indian Bollywood actress
 Raghu Dixit, Indian singer-songwriter, producer, and film score composer who is the frontman for the Raghu Dixit Project, a multilingual folk music band.
 Rajiv Dixit, Indian social activist
 Rahul Dixit, Telecommunications engineer, IEEE Fellow
 Vishva Dixit, Biomedical scientist

Dikshit
 Anurag Dikshit, software developer for PartyGaming and convicted felon
 Sandeep Dikshit, an INC member of Lok Sabha from East Delhi
 Sheila Dikshit, former Chief Minister of Delhi
 Uma Shankar Dikshit, Indian politician

Dikshita
 Appayya Dikshita (1520–1593), Performer of yajñas, a practitioner of the Advaita Vedanta school of Hindu philosophy with a focus on Shiva or Siva Advaita
 Govinda Dikshita, Minister of three successive Nayaks of Thanjavur, who ruled the region of Thanjavur in Southern India in the 16th and 17th centuries CE

Dikshitar
 Muthuswami Dikshitar, one of the Carnatic Music Trinity
 Subbarama Dikshitar (1839–1906), Carnatic music composer

See also
Dixit (disambiguation)
Dikshitar

Notes

Ethnic groups in Nepal
Bahun
Nepali-language surnames
Khas surnames
Indian surnames
Occupational surnames